Sarben is an unincorporated community and census-designated place in Keith County, Nebraska, United States. As of the 2010 census it had a population of 31.

Geography
Sarben is in eastern Keith County, in the valley of the North Platte River.

Demographics

History
Sarben had its start by the building of the Union Pacific Railroad through that territory. Sarben took its name from "Aksarben", or "Nebraska" spelled backwards.

See also
 List of geographic names derived from anagrams and ananyms

References

Census-designated places in Keith County, Nebraska
Census-designated places in Nebraska